Christopher Stack (born June 13 in Chicago, Illinois), is an actor who took over the role of Michael McBain, replacing Nathaniel Marston, on the ABC soap opera One Life to Live from December 3, 2007, to June 17, 2009. Stack temporarily returned as Michael from July 14 to 16, 2009.

Career
Stack is a graduate of the Actors Studio Drama School at Pace University. In 2000 he portrayed the role of the Coach in Liz Tuccillo's play Joe Fearless Off-Broadway with the Atlantic Theater Company. He starred as Ted in the world premiere of Maria Micheles's play Sleep Over at the Theater for the New City in 2013.

Before joining the cast of One Life to Live, Stack appeared on the CBS soap opera As the World Turns as Walt in 2006. He has also appeared on Conviction (2006), Third Watch (2006) and in the recurring role of Alec on The Education of Max Bickford from 2001 to 2002.

Stack portrayed Chris in the 2002 film Roger Dodger and Doug in the 2003 film School of Rock.

Filmography

References

External links

American male film actors
American male soap opera actors
Living people
Male actors from Chicago
Male actors from Illinois
Year of birth missing (living people)